Davi Alexandre Rancan (born September 22, 1981 in São Paulo, Brazil) is a Brazilian former footballer.

External links
 
 
 
 
 

1981 births
Living people
Brazilian footballers
Brazilian expatriate footballers
Associação Atlética Portuguesa (Santos) players
Sport Club Internacional players
ASC Oțelul Galați players
AFC Dacia Unirea Brăila players
Moroka Swallows F.C. players
Independiente Medellín footballers
Categoría Primera A players
Expatriate footballers in Colombia
Expatriate footballers in Finland
Expatriate footballers in Romania
Expatriate soccer players in South Africa
Association football defenders
Footballers from São Paulo